The 1983–1984 Buffalo Sabres season was the Sabres' 14th season. Tom Barrasso was drafted by the Sabres with the 5th overall pick in the 1983 NHL Entry Draft, becoming the highest drafted goalie ever until Roberto Luongo was taken 4th overall in 1997. Skipping a college career, he went straight from high school to the NHL where he exceeded all expectations. Barrasso won the Calder Memorial Trophy and Vezina Trophy in his first season, becoming just the third player to win both awards in the same year.

Offseason

NHL Draft

Regular season

Season standings

Schedule and results

Player statistics

Forwards
Note: GP = Games played; G = Goals; A = Assists; Pts = Points; PIM = Penalty minutes

Defencemen
Note: GP = Games played; G = Goals; A = Assists; Pts = Points; PIM = Penalty minutes

Goaltending
Note: GP = Games played; W = Wins; L = Losses; T = Ties; SO = Shutouts; GAA = Goals against average

Playoffs
The Sabres qualified for the playoffs and lost to the Quebec Nordiques 3 games to 0, in the Adams Division Semi-finals.

Awards and records
 Tom Barrasso, Calder Memorial Trophy
 Tom Barrasso, Vezina Trophy
 Tom Barrasso, Goaltender, NHL First Team All-Star

References
 Sabres on Hockey Database

Buffalo Sabres seasons
Buffalo
Buffalo
Buffalo
Buffalo